Laura Checkley is an English actress and comedian known for playing the regular character Louise throughout three series of Detectorists on BBC Four, Monica in Action Team on ITV2, Terri King, wife of the titular character played by Tom Davis, in the BBC One sitcom King Gary. and the hilarious Mrs Blocker in BAFTA award winning Drama In My Skin. She has also appeared in guest roles on a number of other programmes including Brassic, Wanderlust, Red Dwarf, Enterprice, Porters, W1A and This Country. Most recently, she played Jackie Stokes in the popular Drama Screw on Channel Four 

In 2009, she burst on to the comedy scene with her comedy duo Checkley Bush with Victoria Bush. In their short time together they ran a hugely popular residency at the Leicester Square Theatre. They performed to sell-out crowds at the Edinburgh Festival and all over the UK, and hosted and played at the Latitude Festival and Manchester Comedy Festival. In 2011, they reached the final of The Funny Women Awards. 

On film, she appeared as Susan, the floor manager of Hard News in Bridget Jones's Baby, and as Maz in Military Wives.

References

External links 

 

English film actresses
Living people
English television actresses
Year of birth missing (living people)